Peru (also known as Peru the Band) is an indie rock trio formed in Long Island, New York in 2014. The band released their first single, "I Need You", in early 2015.

References

Indie rock musical groups from New York (state)
Musical groups from Long Island